Holly Pearson (born 7 September 1998) is a field hockey player from New Zealand, who plays as a forward.

Career

National teams

Under–21
Holly Pearson debuted for the New Zealand U–21 team in 2018 during a test series against Australia in Hastings, New Zealand. During the series she finished as highest scorer.

She followed this up with an appearance during a Tri-Nations Tournament in Canberra, Australia in 2019, competing against Australia and India.

Black Sticks
Pearson made her debut for the Black Sticks in 2019 during Season One of the FIH Pro League. Following the Pro League, Pearson appeared at the Oceania Cup in Rockhampton, where the Black Sticks won gold and gained qualification to the 2020 Summer Olympics.

References

External links
 
 
 
 
 

1998 births
Living people
Female field hockey forwards
Field hockey players at the 2020 Summer Olympics
Olympic field hockey players of New Zealand
21st-century New Zealand women